Ajain is a commune in the Creuse department in the Nouvelle-Aquitaine region in central France.

Geography

History
During the French Revolution of 1848, 16 villagers were killed attempting to seek the release of their friends, imprisoned for tax evasion.

Population

Sights
 The church of St.Pierre, dating from the thirteenth century.
 The chapel of Notre-Dame.
 A stone commemorating the revolt of 1848.

See also
Communes of the Creuse department

References

Communes of Creuse